Dimitrios Chidemenakis (born , in Chánia) is a Greek male  track cyclist, riding for the national team. He competed in the team pursuit event at the 2010 UCI Track Cycling World Championships.

References

External links
 Profile at cyclingarchives.com

1991 births
Living people
Greek track cyclists
Greek male cyclists
Sportspeople from Chania
21st-century Greek people